is a Japanese ski jumper and the 2011 World University Vice Champion.

Career
At the age of 14, Hirayama started her career as a ski jumper at the FIS Race in Sapporo in 2005 where she placed eighth. In 2007, Hirayama placed 22nd at the Junior World Championships in Tarvisio but did not take part in races outside Japan until 2010. In 2010, at the Junior World Championships in Hinterzarten Hirayama placed 24th. In 2011/12, Hirayama took part in the World Cup competitions in Zao placing 35th and 34th. In 2012/13, Hirayama is present at the complete World Cup series (Lillehammer: 46th, Sochi: 36th and 38th, Ramsau: 27th, Schonach: 22nd and 30th).

References

External links 

 FIS Biography in English
 Hirayama's Blog in Japanese

1990 births
Living people
Japanese female ski jumpers
Universiade medalists in ski jumping
Universiade silver medalists for Japan
Competitors at the 2011 Winter Universiade
20th-century Japanese women
21st-century Japanese women